The American Bankruptcy Law Journal is a peer-reviewed law review focusing on bankruptcy issues. It is published by the National Conference of Bankruptcy Judges.

External links
 

+
United States bankruptcy law
American law journals
Quarterly journals
English-language journals
Publications established in 1993